Elizabeth Casado Irizarry (born August 29, 1965) is a Puerto Rican politician affiliated with the New Progressive Party (PNP). She was a member of the Puerto Rico House of Representatives from 2009 to 2013 representing District 40.

Early years and studies

Elizabeth Casado Irizarry was born on August 29, 1965 in Brooklyn, New York. At the age of 2, her parents brought her to live in Carolina.

Casado studied at the University of Puerto Rico at Río Piedras, where she completed a Bachelor's degree in Marketing. She also studied piano at the Conservatory of Music of Puerto Rico.

In 1997, Casado completed a Juris doctor of Law at the Interamerican University of Puerto Rico School of Law, graduating Cum laude.

Professional career

After graduating, Casado practiced law, specializing in the citizens of Carolina, where she had her offices.

Political career

Casado was first elected to the House of Representatives of Puerto Rico at the 2008 general election. She was elected to represent District 40. After one term, Casado wasn't reelected in 2012.

After losing her reelection bid, Governor Luis Fortuño appointed Casado to be District Attorney. Her appointment was confirmed by the Senate of Puerto Rico on December 20, 2012.

Personal life

Casado was married to Pedro Benítez Rodríguez. They divorced in 2006 after 13 years of relationship. According to Casado, she was victim of domestic abuse.

References

External links
Elizabeth Casado Official biography

Living people
1965 births
New Progressive Party members of the House of Representatives of Puerto Rico
Politicians from New York City
University of Puerto Rico alumni